The 1987 International Formula 3000 season was the third season of FIA Formula 3000 motor racing. It featured the 1987 Formula 3000 Intercontinental Championship, which was contested over an eleven round series in which 23 different teams, 53 different drivers, 4 different chassis constructors and 3 different engines manufacturers competed. The championship was won by Stefano Modena who drove a March 87B Ford Cosworth for Onyx Racing.

Drivers and teams

Calendar

Note:

Race 3 stopped early due to an accident involving Alfonso de Vinuesa and Luis Pérez-Sala. Only half-points were awarded.

Championship standings
At each race points were awarded as follows: 9 for first place, 6 for second place, 4 for third place, 3 for fourth place, 2 for fifth place and 1 for sixth place. The best seven results could be retained. Discarded points and gross totals are displayed within tooltips.

Complete Overview

R10=retired, but classified NC=not classified R=retired NQ=did not qualify 8P=grid position, but started from pit lane

References

International Formula 3000
International Formula 3000 seasons